A comprehensive list of Werewolf: The Apocalypse books by White Wolf Publishing, including production code and ISBN.

Werewolf: The Apocalypse
{| class="wikitable sortable"
!Book Name!!White Wolf Product Number!!ISBN Number!!Date Published
|-
| Werewolf: The Apocalypse (1st Edition) || WW3000 ||  || 1992
|-
| Werewolf Screen (1st Edition) || WW3001 ||  || 1992 
|-
| Rite of Passage || WW3002 ||  || 1992
|-
| Ways of the Wolf || WW3050 ||  || 1993
|-
| Tribebook: Black Furies (1st Edition) || WW3051 ||  || 1994
|-
| Tribebook: Bone Gnawers (1st Edition) || WW3052 ||  || 1994
|-
| Tribebook: Children of Gaia (1st Edition) || WW3053 ||  || 1994
|-
| Tribebook: Fianna (1st Edition) || WW3054 ||  || 1994
|-
| Tribebook: Get of Fenris (1st Edition) || WW3055 ||  || 1995
|-
| Tribebook: Glass Walkers (1st Edition) || WW3056 ||  || 1995
|-
| Tribebook: Red Talons (1st Edition) || WW3057 ||  || 1995
|-
| Tribebook: Shadow Lords (1st Edition) || WW3058 ||  || 1995
|-
| Tribebook: Silent Striders (1st Edition) || WW3059 ||  || 1996
|-
| Tribebook: Silver Fangs (1st Edition) || WW3060 ||  || 1997
|-
| Tribebook: Stargazers (1st Edition) || WW3061 ||  || 1997
|-
| Tribebook: Uktena (1st Edition) || WW3062 ||  || 1998
|-
| Hengeyokai: Shapeshifters of the East || WW3063 ||  || 1998
|-
| Project Twilight || WW3064 ||  || 1995
|-
| Freak Legion: A Player's Guide to Fomori || WW3066 ||  || 1995
|-
| Axis Mundi: The Book of Spirits || WW3067 ||  || 1996
|-
| Rage Across the World Volume 1 || WW3069 ||  || 1996
|-
| Rage Across the World Volume 2 || WW3070 ||  || 1996
|-
| Rage Across the World Volume 3 || WW3071 ||  || 1996
|-
| Kinfolk: Unsung Heroes || WW3074 ||  || 1997
|-
| Breedbook: Bastet || WW3075 ||  || 1997
|-
| Breedbook: Nuwisha || WW3076 ||  || 1997
|-
| Breedbook: Corax || WW3077 ||  || 1998
|-
| Tribebook: Wendigo (1st Edition) || WW3078 ||  || 1998
|-
| Breedbook: Gurahl || WW3079 ||  || 1998
|-
| Breedbook: Ratkin || WW3080 ||  || 1999
|-
| Breedbook: Mokolé || WW3081 ||  || 1999
|-
| Breedbook: Ananasi || WW3082 ||  || 2000
|-
| Breedbook: Rokea || WW3083 ||  || 2001
|-
| Breedbook: Nagah || WW3084 ||  || 2001
|-
| Rage Across New York || WW3100 ||  || 1992
|-
| Valkenburg Foundation || WW3101 ||  || 1993
|-
| Under a Blood Red Moon || WW3102 ||  || 1993
|-
| Dark Alliance: Vancouver || WW3103 ||  || 1993
|-
| Rage Across the Amazon || WW3104 ||  || 1993
|-
| Rage Across Russia || WW3105 ||  || 1993
|-
| Rage Across Australia || WW3106 ||  || 1994
|-
| Rage Across Appalachia || WW3107 ||  || 1995 
|-
| Werewolf Players Guide (2nd Edition) || WW3108 ||  || 1998
|-
| Book of the Wyrm (2nd Edition) || WW3109 ||  || 1998
|-
| Rage Across the Heavens || WW3110 ||  || 1999
|-
| Umbra (Revised Edition) || WW3111 ||  || 2001
|-
| Croatan Song || WW3112 ||  || 2000
|-
| Book of the Wyld || WW3113 ||  || 2001
|-
| Rage Across Egypt || WW3114 ||  || 2001  
|-
| Book of the Wyrm (1st Edition) || WW3200 ||  || 1993
|-
| Caerns: Places of Power || WW3201 ||  || 1993
|-
| Werewolf Players Guide (1st Edition) || WW3202 ||  || 1993
|-
| Monkeywrench: Pentex || WW3203 ||  || 1994
|-
| Werewolf Storytellers Handbook || WW3205 ||  || 1994
|-
| Werewolf Chronicles Volume 1 || WW3207 ||  || 1996
|-
| Werewolf Chronicles Volume 2 || WW3208 ||  || 1997
|-
| Book of the Weaver || WW3209 ||  || 1998
|-
| The Silver Record || WW3210 ||  || 1999
|-
| Subsidiaries: A Guide to Pentex || WW3211 ||  || 2000
|-
| Guardians of the Caerns || WW3212 ||  || 2000
|-
| A World of Rage || WW3213 ||  || 2000
|- 
| Litany of the Tribes Volume 1 || WW3380 ||  || 1997
|-
| Litany of the Tribes Volume 2 || WW3381 ||  || 1998
|-
| Litany of the Tribes Volume 3 || WW3382 ||  || 1998
|-
| Litany of the Tribes Volume 4 || WW3383 ||  || 2000
|-
| Who’s Who Among Werewolves: Garou Saga || WW3401 ||  || 1994
|-
| Rage: Warriors of the Apocalypse || WW3403 ||  || 1996
|-
| Chronicle of the Black Labyrinth || WW3404 ||  || 1996
|-
| Werewolf: The Apocalypse (2nd Edition) || WW3600 ||  || 1994
|-
| Werewolf Screen (2nd Edition) || WW3601 ||  || 1994
|-
| Werewolf: The Wild West || WW3700 ||  || 1997
|-
| Frontier Secrets: Werewolf: The Wild West Screen and Book || WW3701 ||  || 1997
|-
| Ghost Towns || WW3703 ||  || 1998
|-
| Wild West Companion || WW3704 ||  || 1998
|-
| Tales from the Trails: Mexico || WW3705 ||  || 1998
|-
| Werewolf: The Apocalypse (Revised Limited Edition) || WW3799 ||  || 2000
|-
| Werewolf: The Dark Ages || WW3800 ||  || 1999
|-
| Werewolf: The Apocalypse (Revised Edition) || WW3801 ||  || 2000
|-
| Werewolf Storytellers Companion (Revised Edition) || WW3802 ||  || 2001
|-
| Art of Werewolf: The Apocalypse || WW3803 ||  || 2000
|-
| Werewolf Storytellers Handbook (Revised Edition) || WW3804 ||  || 2002
|-
| Players Guide to Garou || WW3806 ||  || 2003
|-
| Players Guide to the Changing Breeds || WW3807 ||  || 2003
|-
| Possessed: A Players Guide || WW3810 ||  || 2002
|-
| Umbra: The Velvet Shadow || WW3204 ||  || 1993
|-
| Book of the City || WW3811 ||  || 2002 
|-
| Book of Auspices || WW3812 ||  || 2003
|-
| Hammer and Klaive || WW3813 ||  || 2003
|-
| Past Lives || WW3814 ||  || 2003
|-
| Tribebook: Black Furies (Revised Edition) || WW3851 ||  || 2001
|-
| Tribebook: Bone Gnawers (Revised Edition) || WW3852 ||  || 2001
|-
| Tribebook: Children of Gaia (Revised Edition) || WW3853 ||  || 2002
|-
| Tribebook: Fianna (Revised Edition) || WW3854 ||  || 2002
|-
| Tribebook: Get of Fenris (Revised Edition) || WW3855 ||  || 2002
|-
| Tribebook: Glass Walkers (Revised Edition) || WW3856 ||  || 2002
|-
| Tribebook: Red Talons (Revised Edition) || WW3857 ||  || 2002
|-
| Tribebook: Shadow Lords (Revised Edition) || WW3858 ||  || 2002
|-
| Tribebook: Silent Striders (Revised Edition) || WW3859 ||  || 2003
|-
| Tribebook: Silver Fangs (Revised Edition) || WW3860 ||  || 2003
|- 
| Tribebook: Stargazers (Revised Edition) || WW3861 ||  || 2003
|-
| Tribebook: Uktena (Revised Edition) || WW3862 ||  || 2003
|-
| Tribebook: Wendigo (Revised Edition) || WW3863 ||  || 2003
|-
| Wild West Poker Deck || WW3938 ||  || 1997
|-
| Apocalypse || WW3999 ||  || 2004
|-
| Dark Ages: Werewolf || WW3800 ||  || 2003
|}

Tribebook Shadow Lords

Shadow Lords Tribebook is a supplement published by White Wolf Publishing in 1995 for the modern-day horror role-playing game Werewolf: The Apocalypse. Shadow Lords Tribebook, a softcover book written by Brian Campbell and illustrated by Andrew Bates, Mike Chaney, James Daly, Matthew Milberger, Steve Prescott, Alex Sheikman, and Dan Smith, is one of thirteen "Tribebooks"; each one describes one of the werewolf tribes. This book details the history and culture of the tribe known as the Shadow Lords. In three chapters and three appendices, it explores their reputation and status around the world, their most famous members and game statistics for their unique abilities.

 Chapter 1: their history.
 Chapter 2: tribal politics and their social order.
 Chapter 3: their relationships and interactions with the other twelve tribes
 Appendix A: peculiarities of the tribe
 Appendix B: archetypes of characters within the tribe
 Appendix C: notable personalities who were members of this tribe, including Rasputin

The book includes a blank character sheet.  In the July 1996 edition of Arcane, Mark Barter gave this book a thumbs up and an above average rating of 8 our of 10 and saying, "Recommended for all referees who either have a Shadow Lord player in their group, or intend to bring the tribe into their games in some way, and especially for players of Shadow Lord characters."

New Books within the Onyx Path 

As of 2011 White Wolf Publishing started to publish new material for the cWoD. These books are available only as Print on Demand or limited-run deluxe editions, therefore they lack ISBN.

During GenCon 2012 it was announced that Onyx Path Publishing has the license to publish table-top RPG material for all classic World of Darkness lines. They will produce the titles previously announced by White Wolf.

{| class="wikitable sortable"
!Book Name!!White Wolf Product Number!!Date Published!!Notes
|-
| Werewolf Translation Guide || - || April 10, 2012 || Exclusive at DriveThruRPG
|-
| Werewolf: The Apocalypse (20th Anniversary Edition) || - || March 6, 2013 || Core Rulebook (abbreviated W20)Since the Kickstarter ended exclusive at DriveThruRPG
|-
| W20 Skinner || - || November 21, 2013 || Adventure/Module - Exclusive at DriveThruRPG
|-
| W20 Changing Breeds || - || November 21, 2013 || Sourcebook - Exclusive at DriveThruRPG
|-
| W20 Rage Across the World || - || December 30, 2013 || Sourcebook - Exclusive at DriveThruRPG
|-
| W20 Cookbook || - || January 16, 2014 || Cookbook - Exclusive at DriveThruRPG
|-
| W20 Wyld West Expansion  || - || June 27, 2014 || Conversion Sourcebook - Exclusive at DriveThruRPG
|-
| W20 White Howlers Tribebook || - || November 5, 2014 || Splatbook - Matches design of 1st Edition TribebooksExclusive at DriveThruRPG
|-
| W20 Umbra: The Velvet Shadow|| - || November 12, 2014 || Sourcebook - Exclusive at DriveThruRPG
|-
| W20 Book of the Wyrm || - || November 13, 2014 || Sourcebook - Exclusive at DriveThruRPG
|-
| W20 Art of Changing Breeds: A Visual Guide to the Fera || - || June 3, 2015 || Art Book - Exclusive at DriveThruRPG
|-
| W20 Storyteller Screen || - || March 23, 2016 || Gamemaster's Screen - Exclusive at DriveThruRPG
|-
| W20 Kinfolk: A Breed Apart || - || October 5, 2016 || Sourcebook - Exclusive at DriveThruRPG
|-
| W20 Shattered Dreams || - || November 16, 2016 || Sourcebook - Exclusive at DriveThruRPG
|-
| W20 Changing Ways || - || December 20, 2017 || Sourcebook - Exclusive at DriveThruRPG
|-
| W20 Pentex Employee Indoctrination Handbook || - || January 17, 2018 || Sourcebook - Exclusive at DriveThruRPG
|-
| W20 Art of Werewolf the Apocalypse || - || November 6, 2019 || Art Book - Exclusive at DriveThruRPG
|-
| W20 Auspice Gift Cards|| - || November 13, 2019 || Gaming Aid - Exclusive at DriveThruRPG
|}

Licensed Books 
In 1993 Steve Jackson Games released Werewolf: the Apocalypse, among other classic World of Darkness lines, as a setting for GURPS.

Known Errors
Some copies of Rage Across the Amazon have  which is the same as Book of the Wyrm (1st Edition).

Novels

Note: Breathe Deeply and The Silver Crown were marketed under the Rage-Logo.
Note: Breathe Deeply makes use of the Amazonas setting, as detailed in the game supplement Rage across the Amazon (1993).
Note: Call to Battle was intended as first of a series about the main character (as written on the cover), but no follow-up was published. The book also makes use of material from the game line Mage: The Ascension.
Note: The Tribe Novel Series refers to the content of The Silver Crown, while The Last Battle refers to the content of the Tribe Novel Series. Many of the main characters in those novels are considered signature characters of the game line.

Novels published by HarperCollins

Novels published by Onyx Path Publishing

Licensed Books 
Pinnacle Entertainment released three instalments of its Dime Novel series set in the world of its roleplaying game Deadlands, that contained a single crossover story with Werewolf: The Wild West. The issues are named „Strange Bedfellows”, „Savage Passage” and „Ground Zero”. All are available in an electronic version on DriveThruRPG. Two issues have conversion guidelines between both games in their respective appendix.

Anthologies

World of Darkness: Strange City contained some of the Werewolf: the Apocalypse short stories also found in When will you rage?, together with stories based on White Wolf's games Vampire: the Masquerade and Wraith: the Oblivion.

The following Books each contain one novel based on Werewolf:The Apocalypse and other novels based on other games set in the same fictional world:

Anthologies published by Onyx Path Publishing

Comics 
Partly retrieved from "http://www.moonstonebooks.com"

Note: These are stand-alone publications. There are also comic strips as introduction elements in the 1st Edition series of Tribebooks, as well as in the Breedbooks and in the 2nd Edition Core Rulebook.

Single Stories

Compilations

References

Werewolf: The Apocalypse
Series of books
Lists of books
Lists about role-playing games
Novels based on role-playing games